Hamadeh or Hamadé or Hamada is a common Arabic surname.

Hamadeh may refer to:
Ali Hamadeh (born 1974), American tennis player of Lebanese origin
Anas Hamadeh (born 1989), Jordanian swimmer
Sam Hamadeh, American media entrepreneur with business interests in digital media, publishing, and film
Trad Hamadeh, Lebanese politician and minister

Hamadeh / Hamadé may refer to:
Marwan Hamadeh or Hamadé (born 1939), Lebanese politician, MP and minister, journalist
Sabri Hamadeh or Hamadé(1902–1976), alternatively Sabri Hamadé, Lebanese politician and long-time Speaker of the Lebanese Parliament

Hamada may refer to:
Hassan Hamada (born 1968), also spelled Hassan al-Hamadeh, former Colonel in the Syrian Air Force who defected to Jordan with his military airplane
Fadi Hammadeh (born 1972), alternatively Fadi Hamadeh, Syrian auto-cross driver

See also
Hamada (disambiguation)
Hamada (name)